Sambor is a rural locality (a selo) in Tabunsky Selsoviet, Tabunsky District, Altai Krai, Russia. The population was 268 as of 2013. There are 3 streets.

Geography 
Sambor is located 8 km east of Tabuny (the district's administrative centre) by road. Udalnoye is the nearest rural locality.

References 

Rural localities in Tabunsky District